The Wallace-Jagdfeld Octagon House built in 1860 is a historic octagonal house located at 171 Forest Avenue in Fond du Lac, Wisconsin. The two-story home features clapboard siding, a front porch, and a central chimney.

On April 26, 2002, it was added to the National Register of Historic Places, becoming the second octagon house in Fond du Lac on the National Register along with the Fond du Lac Octagon House. It is located across the street from two other listings on the National Register, Hotel Calumet and the Chicago and Northwestern Railroad Depot.

See also
 Octagon House (Fond du Lac, Wisconsin), located at 276 Linden Street

References

Octagon houses in Wisconsin
Houses completed in 1860
Houses on the National Register of Historic Places in Wisconsin
Fond du Lac, Wisconsin
Houses in Fond du Lac County, Wisconsin
National Register of Historic Places in Fond du Lac County, Wisconsin